The Mortgage Bank of Uruguay a state-owned bank in Uruguay.

History 
Established on March 24, 1892 by President Julio Herrera y Obes as an autonomous state entity.

It plays an important role in the local mortgage market. It is listed at the BVM.

External links 
 

Housing in Uruguay
Government-owned companies of Uruguay
Banks of Uruguay
Mortgage lenders
Banks established in 1892